Fritz Hirsch (21 April 1871 – 18 July 1938) was a German art historian, architect, and pioneer of state-sponsored historical preservation.

Early life
Fritz Hirsh was born on 21 April 1871 in Konstanz, in the German Empire, to parents of Jewish descent.

Education
Hirsch graduated from a Konstanz gymnasium in 1889 and then began studying art and architecture in Karlsruhe and Munich. Also in 1889, while in Karlsruhe, he joined the  fraternity.

From 1895, he worked as an apprentice architect at the inspection offices of the Konstanz and Heidelberg districts. He received his doctorate in 1897 while in Heidelberg with a thesis on the Baroque sculptor . In the same year, he took a teaching position at an architecture school in Lübeck.

Career
In 1900, Hirsch became an assessor specializing in architecture for the government Heidelberg. Five years later, he was the district inspector for Bruchsal. From 1900 to 1909, he directed a restoration of Schloss Bruchsal and the nearby , a groundbreaking landmark in the field of historical preservation. In particular, Hirsch emphasized before anything else the value of accurate sources and documentation.

Hirsch was dismissed from all his positions in 1933 by the anti-Semitic Law for the Restoration of the Professional Civil Service.

Honors
Hirsch was named an honorary citizen of the city of Schwetzingen and an honorary senator at the University of Freiburg.

References

1871 births
1938 deaths
People from Konstanz
People from Bruchsal
People from Schwetzingen
German architectural historians
19th-century German Jews

de:Landesamt für Denkmalpflege Baden-Württemberg